KK Jolly JBS may refer to:

 ŽKK Jolly JBS, women's basketball club
 KK Jolly Jadranska Banka, men's basketball club